The IAAF Super Grand Prix was an annual series of one-day track and field competitions organized by the International Association of Athletics Federations (IAAF). Over the competition's history, a total of nine different meetings were part of the circuit – all of which were European meetings with the sole exception of the Qatar Athletic Super Grand Prix, introduced in 2004.

Created in 2003, it became the second-highest tier in the IAAF World Outdoor Meetings series, behind the IAAF Golden League and above the IAAF Grand Prix and IAAF Grand Prix II level meetings. It began with seven meetings and expanded to eight meetings for the 2004 and 2005 series. In 2006 the competition was incorporated into the IAAF World Athletics Tour, retaining its status as the second highest tier of annual meetings. The series was reduced in scope to six meetings that year, then had only five meetings in its last three years. 

Athletes earned points at the meetings, dependent upon their finishing position, and the overall points leaders from the wider circuit gained entry to the annual IAAF World Athletics Final. The IAAF Super Grand Prix was made defunct along with the World Athletics Tour in 2010, as both were replaced by the IAAF Diamond League and IAAF World Challenge series. Six of the nine Super Grand Prix meetings were elevated to the Diamond League series.

Editions
Key:

Meetings

References

External links
IAAF World Athletics Tour site (archived)

 
Super Grand Prix
Annual athletics series
Super
Super
Defunct athletics competitions
Recurring sporting events established in 2003
Recurring sporting events disestablished in 2009
Super Grand Prix